William Ray Forrester (January 14, 1911 – February 16, 2001) served as the dean of three law schools: (1) Vanderbilt University Law School; (2) Tulane University Law School; and (3) Cornell University Law School.

Forrester was born in Little Rock, Arkansas. He earned his B.A. degree from the University of Arkansas and his J.D. degree from the University of Chicago Law School.

Forrester served as Dean of the Vanderbilt Law School in Nashville, Tennessee from 1949 to 1952, at Tulane from 1952 to 1963, and at Cornell University Law School in Ithaca, New York from 1963 to 1973.

References

University of Arkansas alumni
University of Chicago Law School alumni
Tulane University faculty
Tulane University Law School faculty
Deans of Tulane University Law School
Deans of law schools in the United States
Cornell University faculty
University of California, Hastings faculty
Vanderbilt University Law School faculty
1911 births
2001 deaths